The men's 110 metres hurdles at the 2022 World Athletics U20 Championships was held at the Estadio Olímpico Pascual Guerrero in Cali, Colombia on 1, 2 and 3 August 2022.

Originally, 56 athletes from 38 countries entered to the competition, however, only 50 of them participated.

Records
U20 standing records prior to the 2022 World Athletics U20 Championships were as follows:

Results

Round 1
The round 1 took place on 1 August, with the 50 athletes involved being splitted into 7 heats, 7 heats of 7 and 1 of 8 athletes. The first 3 athletes in each heat ( Q ) and the next 3 fastest ( q ) qualified to the semi-final. The overall results were as follows:

Wind:Heat 1: 0.0 m/s, Heat 2: +0.2 m/s, Heat 3: +1.6 m/s, Heat 4: +0.2 m/s, Heat 5: -0.3 m/s, Heat 6: -0.3 m/s, Heat 7: +0.5 m/s

Semi-final
The semi-final took place on 2 August, with the 24 athletes involved being splitted into 3 heats of 8 athletes each. The first 2 athletes in each heat ( Q ) and the next 2 fastest ( q ) qualified to the final. The overall results were as follows:

Wind:Heat 1: +0.3 m/s, Heat 2: +0.3 m/s, Heat 3: +0.5 m/s

Final
The final was started at 17:59 on 3 August. The results were as follows:

Wind: +0.2 m/s

References

100 metres hurdles men
Sprint hurdles at the World Athletics U20 Championships